Eristalis brousii, the hourglass drone fly, is a species of syrphid fly largely eliminated in most of its former range except in northern Canada. It was first officially described by Williston in 1882. The adults are also known as flower flies because they are commonly found around and on flowers from which they get both energy-giving nectar and protein-rich pollen. The larvae are aquatic filter-feeders of the rat-tailed type.

Description 
E. brousii is similar to Eristalis arbustorum except for in E. brousii the mesotibia (middle leg) that is yellow on the basal 1/2 or less and the basal tarsomere of the mesoleg reddish brown to black. In E. arbustorum the mesotibia is yellow on the basal third or less and the basal tarsomeres of the mesolegs are brown to black.  E. brousii has been eliminated/replaced by E. arbustorum except around the Hudson Bay region of Canada.

Head 
The frontal triangle is a little shining along the middle. In a female, the front is reddish pollinose, more shining above the antennae.  The face is black, shining, thickly clothed with yellow pollen and pile, leaving the tubercle, the oral margin, and the cheeks shining black. The:antennae are black with third joint (flagellum) somewhat reddish. The  eyes  are pilose and in the male contiguous for a short distance only. The arista is reddish and briefly pilose near the base: The posterior lateral orbits are white pollinose.

Thorax 
The scutum is shining black and with a coppery luster. Two opaque, lighter colored, rather broad stripes, reach from the front to the scutellum. These are limited by three narrow, opaque, black stripes;  The pile of the scutum is light reddish yellowish, scarcely apparent from above. The scutellum is subtranslucent yellowish or reddish on the outer part. The pile of the pleurae is whitish.

Wings 
The wings are hyaline with a minutely brownish stigma. In a female the wing has  a large faint brownish spot. Noteworthy veination - Spurious vein (sv), looping of R4+5 into r4+5, closed cell r2+3.anterior cross- vein (r-m) near the middle of discal cell (dm), oblique.

Abdomen 
The abdomen in a male as follows : first segment all black, the second segment orange-yellow, broadly on the sides and narrowly across on the hind border, elsewhere opaque black ; on the posterior part the black includes nearly a third of the width of the segment; the sides approach each other a little towards the front and then at nearly right angles extend outward along the anterior margin of the segment; the lateral prolongations are convex on their hind borders and reach acutely nearly to the lateral margins ; third segment with large, similar colored spots, confluent with the yellow in front, but rounded on the internal posterior angles and usually not quite reaching the yellow of the hind margins ; across the middle of the segment a shining metallic band interrupted in the middle, elsewhere the black is opaque; fourth segment wholly shining, with a narrow yellow hind margin and sometimes with a small spot of opaque black in front ; hypopygium shining black. In the female the markings are rarely like those of the male, chiefly shining black ; the second segment sometimes with a small red dish spot on the side, the opaque marking as in the male; the third and fourth segments sometimes with a small opaque spot in front; second, third, and fourth segments sometimes rather broadly whitish pollinose on the hind border ; the hind margins more narrowly reddish yellow.

Distribution
The population of this species has suffered a large decline in North America since the introduction of the European species E. arbustorum introduced near Toronto around 1885.  Currently this species is only found along the lake margin of the Hudson Bay

References

Eristalinae
Articles created by Qbugbot